Kerana Karina ("Because of Karina") is the first web drama to be produced in Malaysia, screened at entertainment portal gua.com.my. This drama series stars Akademi Fantasia alumnus Marsha Milan Londoh, Sazzy Falak, Zizan Nin, Elaine Daly and ex-Malaysian Idol judge Roslan Aziz.

Kerana Karina is now in its third season, beginning 20 October 2008. Having garnered almost 900,000 video views, the first season of the show was a big hit among the young Malaysian online community.

External links
Kerana Karina season 3
 Pelancaran Kerana Karina.

Malaysian drama television series
Drama web series